On the Issues is an online-only progressive feminist news and opinion magazine founded in 1983 as a print magazine: On the Issues: The Progressive Woman's Quarterly.

History
On the Issues was started by social psychologist Merle Hoffman in 1983 as a quarterly print magazine intended for an audience of "thinking feminists". The magazine has operated out of Forest Hills, New York, and also out of Flushing. It was primarily written by freelance writers.

Earlier in 1971, Hoffman established Choices Women's Medical Center. A pro-choice activist, Hoffman has said that "women's lives, women's thinking, women's votes, women's power matter." In 1999, Hoffman added an online component to the magazine.

In 2008 after 25 years of publishing, Hoffman ceased printing the magazine and transferred it to an online-only format based in Long Island City, New York.

Content
On the Issues was founded as a progressive alternative to mainstream media coverage. The first number carried articles about the beginnings of AIDS and about the newly described condition of premenstrual syndrome (PMS). Among many other topics covered in the magazine have been surgical practices on genitals, domestic violence and eco-feminism. Every issue includes a section reporting recent developments in the reproductive rights debate.

Hoffman is an animal rights feminist; the magazine has carried articles sympathetic to animal rights. Animal rights advocates such as Carol J. Adams, Joan Dunayer and Roberta Kalechofsky have contributed articles.

Reception
Professor Gerald Sussman of Portland State University described the magazine as "Gramscian", that is, promoting revolutionary change but within the existing political structure, as described by Italian political theorist Antonio Gramsci. Leftist Mother Jones magazine described On the Issues as "a strong feminist voice that's reasoned, literate, highly readable, and tackles topics of concern to women." The Utne Reader praised On the Issues as "articulat[ing] the female experience through many feminist voices and without resorting to male-bashing."

Contributors

Cindy Cooper, Managing Editor
Sarah Browning, Poetry co-editor
Judith Arcana, Poetry co-editor
Mark D. Phillips, Technical and creative design director
Linda Stein, Art editor
Eleanor Bader, Contributing editor
Vanessa Valenti, Social media editor
Elayne Rapping
Leslie Cagan
Carol J. Adams
Carol Downer
Margaret Morganroth Gullette
Amanda Marcotte
Laura Whitehorn
Ursula K. Le Guin
Toi Derricotte
Helène Aylon
Guerrilla Girls
Jesus Barraza
Melanie Cervantes
Favianna Rodriguez
Naomi Wolf
John Stoltenberg
Roberta Kalechofsky
Marcy Bloom
Sonia Pressman Fuentes
Joan Dunayer
Barbara Katz Rothman
Amy Goodman

References

External links
 
 Choices Women's Medical Center

Defunct women's magazines published in the United States
Feminism in New York City
Feminist magazines
Magazines established in 1983
Magazines disestablished in 2008
Magazines published in New York (state)
Online magazines published in the United States
Online magazines with defunct print editions
Progressivism in the United States